The Roman Catholic Diocese of Villarrica is a diocese located in the city of Villarrica in the Ecclesiastical province of Concepción in Chile.

History
 16 July 1901: Established as Apostolic Prefecture of Araucanía from the Diocese of Concepción and Diocese of San Carlos de Ancud
 28 March 1928: Promoted as Apostolic Vicariate of Araucanía
 19 November 2001: Promoted as Diocese of Villarrica

Bishops

Ordinaries, in reverse chronological order
 Bishops of Villarrica (Roman rite), below
 Bishop Francisco Javier Stegmeier Schmidlin (2009.02.07 – )
 Bishop Sixto José Parzinger Foidl, O.F.M. Cap. (2001.11.19 – 2009.02.07)
 Vicars Apostolic of Araucanía (Roman rite), below
 Bishop Sixto José Parzinger Foidl, O.F.M. Cap. (1977.12.17 – 2001.11.19)
 Bishop Carlos Guillermo Hartl de Laufen, O.F.M. Cap. (1958.03.05 – 1977.02.06)
 Bishop Guido Benedetto Beck de Ramberga, O.F.M. Cap. (1928.03.28 – 1958.03.05)
 Prefect Apostolic of Araucanía (Roman rite), below
 Bishop Guido Benedetto Beck de Ramberga, O.F.M. Cap. (1925.01.20 – 1928.03.28)

Coadjutor vicar apostolic
Carlos Guillermo Hartl de Laufen, O.F.M. Cap (1956-1958)

Other priest of this diocese who became bishop
René Osvaldo Rebolledo Salinas, appointed Bishop of Osorno in 2004

Sources

 GCatholic.org
 Catholic Hierarchy
 Diocese website

Roman Catholic dioceses in Chile
Christian organizations established in 1901
Roman Catholic dioceses and prelatures established in the 20th century
Villarrica, Roman Catholic Diocese of
1901 establishments in Chile